Sudan's human rights record has been widely condemned. Some human rights organizations have documented a variety of abuses and atrocities carried out by the Sudanese government over the past several years under the rule of Omar al-Bashir. The 2009 Human Rights Report by the United States Department of State noted serious concerns over human rights violations by the government and militia groups. Capital punishment, including crucifixion, is used for many crimes. In September, 2019, the government of Sudan signed an agreement with the UN High Commissioner for Human Rights to open a UN Human Rights Office in Khartoum and field offices in Darfur, Blue Nile, Southern Kordofan and East Sudan. In July 2020, during the 2019–2021 Sudanese transition to democracy, Justice Minister Nasredeen Abdulbari stated that "all the laws violating the human rights in Sudan" were to be scrapped, and for this reason, Parliament passed a series of laws in early July 2020.

Abuses in conflict settings

Conflicts between the government and rebel groups—the civil war involving north–south tensions, the Darfur conflict involving Arab-tribespeople tensions in the Darfur region in the west—have resulted in rape, torture, killings, and massive population displacements (estimated at over 2 million in 2007), earning Sudan comparison to Rwanda in the press. There have also been several reported cases of crucifixions carried out in Sudan.

According to The Christian Science Monitor on 25 March 2004:
The Darfur region war boils down to this: African tribes have long been at odds with Arab groups in the region over access to good land. Then, last year, two armed African groups began a rebellion against the Khartoum regime. The government responded by apparently giving military support to Arab militias. There are reports of Sudanese military planes bombing villages, after which Arab militias go in and rape and kill survivors.

Ethnic cleansing in Darfur 
The conflict has been described by Mukesh Kapila, United Nations (UN) coordinator for Sudan, as ethnic cleansing, as Black Arab militias carry out systematic massacres of tribespeople in the Darfur region. According to Kapila, "The government has a close knowledge of what's going on - and can influence the Arab militia." The UN has estimated that 300,000 civilians in the Darfur region were killed between 2003 and 2010.

Arbitrary detentions 
On April 28, 2022, Human Rights Watch released a report, that documented detention of hundreds of illegal protesters by Sudanese security forces against the backdrop of expressing opinion in an attempt to instill fear in the hearts of those opposed to military rule. The report revealed the security forces' violent practices against demonstrators of sexual assault and threats of rape. Moreover, the United Nations Human Rights Office in Sudan indicated that more than a thousand people were arrested within a few months, including 148 children.

Slavery

Some organizations, in particular Christian Solidarity Worldwide and related organizations, argue that enslavement exists in Sudan and is encouraged by the Sudanese government. As an example of such allegations, in The Wall Street Journal on 12 December 2001, Michael Rubin said:

...On 4 October, Sudanese Vice President Ali Uthman Taha declared, "The jihad is our way and we will not abandon it and will keep its banner high."

Between 23 and 26 October, Sudanese government troops attacked villages near the southern town of Aweil, killing 93 men and enslaving 85 women and children. Then, on 2 November, the Sudanese military attacked villages near the town of Nyamlell, carrying off another 113 women and children. A Kenyan aide worker was also abducted, and has not been seen since.

What's Sudanese slavery like? One 11-year-old Christian boy told me about his first days in captivity: "I was told to be a Muslim several times, and I refused, which is why they cut off my finger." Twelve-year-old Alokor Ngor Deng was taken as a slave in 1993. She has not seen her mother since the slave raiders sold the two to different masters. Thirteen-year-old Akon was seized by Sudanese military while in her village five years ago. She was gang-raped by six government soldiers, and witnessed seven executions before being sold to a Sudanese Arab.

Many freed slaves bore signs of beatings, burnings and other tortures. More than three-quarters of formerly enslaved women and girls reported rapes.

While nongovernmental organizations argue over how to end slavery, few deny the existence of the practice. Estimates of the number of blacks now enslaved in Sudan vary from tens of thousands to hundreds of thousands (not counting those sold as forced labor in Libya)

On the other hand, fraud in the name of "slave redemption" has been documented before.

Women's rights

Sudan is a developing nation that faces many challenges in regard to gender inequality. Freedom House gave Sudan the lowest possible ranking among repressive regimes during 2012. South Sudan received a slightly higher rating but it was also rated as "not free". In the 2013 report of 2012 data, Sudan ranks 171st out of 186 countries on the Human Development Index (HDI). Sudan also is one of very few countries that are not a signatory on the Convention on the Elimination of All Forms of Discrimination Against Women (CEDAW).

Despite all of this, there have been positive changes in regard to gender equality in Sudan. As of 2012, women embodied 24.1% of the National Assembly of Sudan. Sudanese women account for a larger percentage of the national parliament than many Westernized nations. Notwithstanding that, gender inequalities in Sudan, particularly as they pertain to female genital mutilation and the disparity of women to men in the labor market, have received attention in the international community.

Sudan signed the Protocol to the African Charter on Human and Peoples' Rights on the Rights of Women in Africa (Maputo Protocol) on 30 June 2008, but as of July 2020 has not ratified it yet.

Democratic transition (2019–present) 

When the democratic transition was initiated in 2019 after large-scale protests led by Sudanese women, gradual legal reform has improved the status of women's rights in the country. In late 2019, the Public Order Act was repealed; it was controversial for various reasons, such as Article 152 of the Act, which stipulated that women who wore trousers in public should be lashed 40 times. Other restrictions targeting women that were repealed included the lack of freedom of dress (by the mandatory hijab and other measures), movement, association, work and study. Alleged violations (many of whom were considered 'arbitrary' by activists) were punished with arrest, beatings and deprivation of civil rights such as freedom of association and expression. According to Ihsan Fagiri, leader of the No to Oppression Against Women Initiative, around 45,000 women were prosecuted under the Public Order Act in 2016 alone.

In April 2020, the Criminal Code was amended to criminalise female genital mutilation (FGM), which was made punishable by a fine and 3 years imprisonment. In July 2020, the need for women to obtain permission from a male relative to travel, and flogging as a form of punishment, were abolished. Women's rights activists such as 500 Words magazine editor Ola Diab and Redress legal advisor Charlie Loudon hailed the abolition of repressive measures and restrictions on women as 'great first steps'. They emphasised that the new laws needed to be enforced and the repealed laws also abandoned in practice, which would require revision of the internal policies of government agencies such as the police, the military and intelligence services. Several other laws that activists demanded to be removed included the prosecution of rape victims for 'adultery', and of women in mixed-sex settings for 'prostitution', other articles dictating women's dress code, and the disbandment of the public order police and dedicated courts that were part of the 'public order regime'.

Child soldiers
According to Rory Mungoven, spokesman for the Coalition to Stop the Use of Child Soldiers, Sudan has one of the worst child soldier problems in the world. There are more than 17,000 child soldiers fighting for the governments' side or for rebel forces even after 25,000 former child soldiers had been demobilized from rebel groups in Southern Sudan in 2001.  They carry AK-47s and M-16s on the front lines of combat, while serving as human mine detectors, participating in suicide missions, and acting as spies.  Many are abducted or recruited by force, and often compelled to follow orders under the threat of death.  Others join armed groups out of desperation or after being subjected to lies and brainwash.  Many children are promised that they are going to attend school, which are actually military training facilities disguised as school.  The facilities, despite being under the direction of the United Nations and international organizations, are where children were brainwashed to become ruthless killers.  Improvements in technology have provided weapons which weigh less, cost less, and can be assembled, loaded, and fired by an illiterate child, adding additional appeal to child soldiers.

Prisoner abuse
Several hundred adults and children were imprisoned after members of the Justice and Equality Movement attacked Khartoum in May 2008, a disproportionate number from the Darfur region. Human Rights Watch criticised the Sudanese government for refusing to provide any information on their whereabouts. Evidence of widespread torture and abuse was found on released prisoners and was gathered in numerous interviews recorded by Human Rights Watch.

In July 2020, flogging as a form of punishment was abolished.

Persecution of human rights defenders
In the period from 2003 to 2011, Mudawi Ibrahim Adam was repeatedly arrested for charges related to his human rights work with the group Sudan Social Development Organization. These arrests were protested by groups including Human Rights Watch, Front Line, and Amnesty International, the latter of whom named him a "prisoner of conscience."

On 5 March 2009, the same day that President Omar al-Bashir was indicted by the ICC, the Sudanese government ordered the closure of SUDO, and its offices were taken over by state security forces. The New York Times reported that the letter closing the offices "came from the Humanitarian Affairs Commission, which is run by Ahmed Haroun, one of the people facing an arrest warrant from the International Criminal Court for mass slaughter in Darfur." The Sudanese government simultaneously expelled "the International Rescue Committee, Oxfam UK, CARE, Mercy Corps and the Dutch section of Doctors Without Borders. Mudawi and SUDO appealed their closure in court, winning the appeal in April 2010. However, according to a 2011 SUDO press release, the organization remains effectively closed: "in Sudan you can win a case but nothing changes. SUDO’s offices remained locked, its assets remained frozen, and the organization in Sudan was not allowed to resume operations."

Religious persecution

Pastors Michael Yat and Peter Yan have been held incommunicado by Sudan's National Intelligence and Security Service (NISS) from 14 December 2014 and 11 January 2015 respectively, on 1 March they were charged with eight offences under the 1991 Penal Code, two of which carry the death sentence. Peter Yan was reported to be arrested whilst enquiring into Michael Yat's welfare, and Michael Yat was arrested following evangelistic preaching.

In July 2020, the punishment (execution) for apostasy for Muslims (Article 126 of the Sudanese Penal Code), and the prohibition on alcohol for non-Muslims, were abolished. The United States Commission on International Religious Freedom (USCIRF) applauded the reforms on 15 July 2020, scrapping Sudan from the list of 'countries of particular concern' (where it had been in 2000–2019), but urged Sudanese lawmakers to repeal the blasphemy law (Article 125 of the Sudanese Penal Code) as well.

Historical situation
The following chart shows Sudan's ratings since 1972 in the Freedom in the World reports, published annually by Freedom House. A rating of 1 is "free"; 7, "not free".

LGBT rights

Lesbian, gay, bisexual, and transgender (LGBT) persons in Sudan face legal challenges not experienced by non-LGBT residents. Both male and female same-sex sexual activity has been illegal in Sudan, with sentences including but not limited to capital punishment. However, in July 2020, the sodomy law that previously punished gay men with up to 100 lashes for the first offence, five years in jail for the second and the death penalty the third time around was abolished, with new legislation reducing the penalty to prison terms ranging from five years to life. Sudanese LGBT+ activists hailed the reform as a 'great first step', but said it was not enough yet, and the end goal should be the decriminalisation of gay sexual activity altogether.

International treaties
Sudan's stances on international human rights treaties are as follows:

See also

 1998 Sudan famine
 Aegis Students, an international student-based genocide prevention movement, focused on Sudan.
 Aegis Trust
 Internet censorship and surveillance in Sudan
 Satellite Sentinel Project

Notes 
1.Note that the "Year" signifies the "Year covered". Therefore the information for the year marked 2008 is from the report published in 2009, and so on.
2.As of 1 January.
3.The 1982 report covers the year 1981 and the first half of 1982, and the following 1984 report covers the second half of 1982 and the whole of 1983. In the interest of simplicity, these two aberrant "year and a half" reports have been split into three-year-long reports through extrapolation.

References

Special report: Sudan in The Economist 15 May 2004
Islam's Dark Side - The Orwellian State of Sudan, The Economist, 24 June 1995.
Sharia and the IMF: Three Years of Revolution, SUDANOW, September 1992.
Final Document of the Synod of the Catholic Diocese of Khartoum, 1991. [noting "oppression and persecution of Christians"]
Human Rights Voice, published by the Sudan Human Rights Organization, Volume I, Issue 3, July/August 1992 [detailing forcible closure of churches, expulsion of priests, forced displacement of populations, forced Islamisation and Arabisation, and other repressive measures of the Government].
Sudan - A Cry for Peace, published by Pax Christi International, Brussels, Belgium, 1994
Sudan - Refugees in their own country: The Forced Relocation of Squatters and Displaced People from Khartoum, in Volume 4, Issue 10, of News from Africa Watch, 10 July 1992.
Human Rights Violations in Sudan, by the Sudan Human Rights Organisation, February 1994. [accounts of widespread torture, ethnic cleansing and crucifixion of pastors].
Pax Romana statement of Macram Max Gassis, Bishop of El Obeid, to the Fiftieth Session of the UN Commission on Human Rights, Geneva, February 1994 [accounts of widespread destrucution of hundreds of churches, forced conversions of Christians to Islam, concentration camps, genocide of the Nuba people, systematic rape of women, enslavement of children, torture of priests and clerics, burning alive of pastors and catechists, crucifixion and mutilation of priests]
Hiwaar organisation

External links

Respect (IHTIRAM), the Sudanese Journal for Human Rights' Culture and Issues of Cultural Diversity
Photojournalist's Account - Images of Sudan's displacement
Living with Refugees
Amnesty International's 2011 Annual Report on Sudan 
Human Rights Watch reports on Sudan
Forced Migration Review
International Christian Concern
ColorQ 1996-1998
12-year-old raped before her execution
Human-induced famine: crops destroyed, food distribution centers bombed
International Freedom of Expression Exchange monitors attacks on the press in Sudan

John Dau Sudan Foundation: Transforming healthcare in Southern Sudan
Hiwaar Human Rights Advocacy Organisation: working for equality